Mário Sílvio Mendes Negromonte Júnior (born 31 August 1980) is a Brazilian politician and lawyer. He has spent his political career representing Bahia, having served in the state legislature from 2011 to 2015 and as a federal deputy representative since 2015.

Personal life
Negromonte Jr. comes from a political family, he is the son of Mário Negromonte and Vilma Negromonte. His father, mother, and uncle are also politicians. He is an alumnus of the Jorge Amado University. He is married to Camila Vasquez. Prior to becoming a politician Negromonte Jr. was a lawyer.

Political career
Negromonte Jr. abstained from the impeachment motion of then-president Dilma Rousseff. Arruda voted in favor of tax reform spending and the 2017 Brazilian labor reform, and voted against opening a corruption investigation against Rousseff's successor Michel Temer.

References

1980 births
Living people
People from Bahia
21st-century Brazilian lawyers
Progressistas politicians
Members of the Chamber of Deputies (Brazil) from Bahia
Members of the Legislative Assembly of Bahia